Günther Maritschnigg (7 November 1933 – 22 January 2013) was a German former wrestler who competed in the 1960 Summer Olympics. He was born in Bochum.

References

External links
 

1933 births
2013 deaths
Olympic wrestlers of the United Team of Germany
Wrestlers at the 1960 Summer Olympics
German male sport wrestlers
Olympic silver medalists for the United Team of Germany
Olympic medalists in wrestling
Sportspeople from Bochum
Medalists at the 1960 Summer Olympics
20th-century German people
21st-century German people